Open Platform for NFV is a collaborative open source platform for network functions virtualization. It was started by the Linux Foundation in 2014. Member companies include 
AT&T, Brocade Communications Systems, China Mobile, Cisco, Dell, Ericsson, Hewlett-Packard, Huawei, IBM, Intel, Juniper Networks, NEC, Nokia Networks, NTT DoCoMo, Orange S.A., Red Hat, Telecom Italia and Vodafone.

References

External links
 OPNFV Homepage
 Virtual Central Office Homepage

Emerging technologies
Linux Foundation projects
Network architecture